Thomas Michael Glavine (born March 25, 1966) is an American former professional baseball pitcher who played 22 seasons in Major League Baseball, for the Atlanta Braves (1987–2002, 2008) and New York Mets (2003–2007).

With 164 victories during the 1990s, Glavine earned the second-highest number of wins as a pitcher in the National League, second only to teammate Greg Maddux' 176. He was a five-time 20-game winner and two-time Cy Young Award winner, and one of only 24 pitchers (and just six left-handers) in major league history to earn 300 career wins. He was the Most Valuable Player of the 1995 World Series as the Braves beat the Cleveland Indians.

On January 8, 2014, Glavine was elected to the Baseball Hall of Fame in his first year of eligibility, receiving 91.9% of the votes cast.

Early years
Glavine was born in Concord, Massachusetts, and raised in Billerica, Massachusetts. Glavine attended Billerica Memorial High School, where he was an excellent student and a letterman in ice hockey as well as baseball. He was a four-year member of the honor roll and the National Honor Society. In hockey, he scored 47 goals and 47 assists in 23 high school games, and as a senior, he was named the Merrimack Valley's Most Valuable Player. In baseball, he led his team to the Division I North Title and the Eastern Massachusetts Championship as a senior. He graduated from high school in 1984 with honors. Glavine was elected to the Billerica Memorial/Howe High School Athletic Hall of Fame in 1993.

Professional career
Glavine was drafted by both the Los Angeles Kings in the 1984 NHL Entry Draft (in the fourth round, 69th overall—two rounds ahead of future National Hockey League star Brett Hull and five rounds ahead of Luc Robitaille, both 2009 Hockey Hall of Fame inductees), and the Atlanta Braves Major League Baseball organization in the second round of the 1984 amateur baseball draft. Glavine elected to play baseball and made his major league debut on August 17, 1987.

Atlanta Braves (1987–2002)

Glavine had mixed results during his first several years in the majors, compiling a 33–43 record from 1987 to 1990, including a 17-loss performance in 1988. His fortunes turned around in 1991, when he won 20 games and posted a 2.55 earned run average. It was his first of three consecutive seasons with 20 or more wins, and saw him earn his first National League Cy Young Award. Glavine was the ace of the 1991 Braves' starting rotation that included Steve Avery, Charlie Leibrandt, and another future NL Cy Young Award winner and Hall of Fame inductee, John Smoltz. His season helped ensure a dramatic reversal in the Braves' competitive fortunes as they won the National League pennant and earned a trip to the World Series, though they lost to the Minnesota Twins in seven games. In an era of the diminishing 20-game winner (there were none in the majors in 2006 and 2009), Glavine became the last major league pitcher to win 20 games in three straight years (1991–1993).

Atlanta, long thought of as a perennial cellar dweller, was lifted in the 1990s into one of the most successful franchises in the game on the strength of its stellar pitching staff and solid hitting. After the Braves acquired Greg Maddux from the Chicago Cubs in 1993, Glavine, Maddux, and Smoltz formed one of the best pitching rotations in baseball history. Among them, they won seven Cy Young Awards during the period of 1991 to 1998. Glavine won his second Cy Young Award in 1998, going 20–6 with a 2.47 ERA. Years later, after Glavine joined the Mets and Maddux played for the San Diego Padres, the three (along with Smoltz who still pitched for Atlanta) all recorded wins on the same day, June 27, 2007. The Braves defeated the Cleveland Indians in six games in the 1995 World Series, and Glavine was named the Series MVP. He won two games during that series: Game 2 and Game 6. In Game 6, he pitched eight innings of one-hit shutout baseball.

In addition to the championship won with the Braves in 1995, he pitched in four other World Series with the team (in 1991, 1992, 1996, and 1999) when the Braves lost to the Minnesota Twins, Toronto Blue Jays, and New York Yankees twice, respectively.

New York Mets (2003–2007)
In 2003, Glavine left Atlanta to play for the rival New York Mets, signing a four-year, $42.5 million deal. Glavine's performance had slumped in the second half of 2002 and he was ineffective in his two postseason starts, so Atlanta refused to guarantee a third year on his contract. Glavine struggled in his first year as a Met. For the first time since 1988, he failed to win 10 games, also posting his first losing record in that span, 9–14. He also allowed his first career grand slam, hit by José Vidro of the Expos on September 19. Glavine did get to enjoy a personal highlight at the end of the season, however, when the Mets called up his brother Mike to join the team.

Glavine began 2004 well, highlighted by a May 23 one-hit shutout of the Colorado Rockies and selection to the National League All-Star team. However, he struggled again during a second half marred by losing front teeth in a car accident while riding in a taxicab. He went on to post a slightly better record, though still a losing one, going 11–14. He started off 2005 slowly, but rebounded after advice from pitching coach Rick Peterson, who encouraged Glavine to begin pitching inside more often (including a change-up in) and incorporate a curveball in his repertoire. Glavine's turnaround helped him earn National League Pitcher of the Month in September. He finished the season with a 13–13 record and a respectable 3.53 ERA.

The Mets' faith in Glavine was rewarded when he returned to his old form during the 2006 season. He finished one victory shy of the NL lead in wins and was selected to the All-Star team. That season Tom Glavine became the first Mets left-hander in nearly 30 years to start at least thirty games in four consecutive seasons. Glavine and the Mets got a scare in August 2006. His pitching shoulder was tested for a blood clot because he was suffering from coldness in his left ring finger. This was originally thought to be a symptom of Raynaud's syndrome, which had been diagnosed in 1990. According to the pitcher, "Doctors... picked something up when they did the ultrasound." The results of that new test showed the problem could be treated with medicine, and Glavine resumed pitching on September 1, against the Houston Astros.

Glavine finished the 2006 season with a fine 15–7 record and a 3.82 ERA, as the Mets won the National League Eastern Division, allowing him to make his first playoff appearance since leaving the Braves. He started Game 2 of the Division Series against the Los Angeles Dodgers, pitching six shutout innings and surrendering only four hits to pick up the win, as the Mets went on to sweep the series from the Dodgers. He then started Game 1 of the National League Championship Series against the St. Louis Cardinals, pitching seven shutout innings to pick up the win, helped by Carlos Beltrán's two-run home run. Glavine's postseason scoreless innings streak ended in his next start. He suffered the loss in Game 5 while the Mets went on to drop the series to the Cardinals in seven games.

Glavine re-signed with the Mets for the 2007 season, needing only 10 wins to reach 300 wins for his career. He started his fourth Opening Day game as a Met in the 2007 season.

On August 5, 2007, Glavine won his 300th game, against the Chicago Cubs at Wrigley Field on ESPN's Sunday Night Baseball. In the game, he also was 1 for 2 with a run batted in and a walk. He pitched  innings and won 8–3, bringing his lifetime record to 300–197. Glavine is the 23rd pitcher to win 300 games, and the fifth left-handed pitcher to do so, joining Eddie Plank, Lefty Grove, Warren Spahn, and Steve Carlton. (Randy Johnson won his 300th game on June 4, 2009, becoming the 24th pitcher and 6th left-hander to do so.)

On September 30, 2007, Glavine started the final game of the Mets' 2007 regular season against the Florida Marlins. The Mets, tied with the Philadelphia Phillies after having squandered a seven-game lead over the past sixteen games, needed a win to either win the division or force a playoff game with the Phillies for the division. Unfortunately, Glavine made one of the worst starts of his career, allowing seven runs while recording only one out, and the Mets were eliminated from playoff contention with an 8–1 loss.

Glavine declined a one-year, $13 million contract option for the 2008 season with the Mets on October 5, 2007, ending his tenure with the team. However, he did collect a $3 million buyout when he declined the $13 million option.

Return to Atlanta Braves (2008) and retirement

On November 18, 2007, Glavine rejoined the Braves, seemingly bringing his career full circle, with a one-year contract worth $8 million. On April 18, 2008, Glavine was placed on the disabled list (DL) for the first time in his 22-year career.

On May 14, 2008, Glavine won his first game with the Atlanta Braves since September 19, 2002. This was also his 304th win, and it occurred while the Atlanta Braves were playing against the Philadelphia Phillies. Coincidentally, both his win on September 19, 2002, and May 14, 2008, were against the Phillies.

On August 14, 2008, Glavine appeared in his final game. He started against the Chicago Cubs, and he gave up seven runs in only four innings. A few days later, he was placed on the disabled list because of a recurring shoulder injury.

On February 19, 2009, Glavine agreed to return to Atlanta by signing a $1 million, one-year contract that included another $3.5 million in possible bonuses based on roster time. However, the Braves released Glavine on June 3, 2009, as he was completing his rehab assignment. On June 20, Glavine announced he would not pitch for the rest of the season. On February 11, 2010, he officially retired from the sport, having strongly hinted at that decision throughout the prior few months.

On the date of his retirement, Glavine agreed to take a job as a special assistant to Braves president John Schuerholz starting in the 2010 season. He was a guest analyst for some Braves games for several seasons. Following the death of his father in 2021, Glavine announced that he would be taking a break from broadcasting during the 2022 season.

The Braves retired Glavine's #47 on August 6, 2010.

On July 29, 2021, Glavine was elected to the Baseball Hall of Fame's Board of Directors.

Pitching style

Glavine, a left-hander, gradually lost velocity over the latter part of his career. Even at the end of his career, he was an effective starting pitcher in the National League due to his excellent control and deception, changing speeds, and locating pitches off the outside corner of the strike zone. His most common approach was to begin by locating his circle changeup off the outside corner, then follow with alternating fastballs and changeups to confuse the hitter. While batters frequently made contact with his pitches, the substantial movement he placed on them made drives very soft, resulting in easily fielded ground balls and fly outs. Glavine's consistency was also highlighted by his durability; beginning with his first full year, in 1988, he started at least 25 games every season and was never placed on the disabled list until his final season—at age 42. In addition to his excellent changeup and well-controlled fastball, Glavine had a plus-curve ball, a slider, and a tailing two-seam fastball. Despite being a left-handed pitcher, Glavine was often more effective against right-handed batters. Dodgers broadcaster Vin Scully noted that this attribute was likely due to Glavine pitching from the extreme right edge of the pitching rubber.

Like longtime Atlanta teammate Greg Maddux, Glavine was one of the better-hitting pitchers of his generation. He had a career .186 batting average—decent for a modern pitcher—and hit over .200 in nine seasons, with a career-best of .289 in 1996. He had a good eye, drawing a high number of walks (for a pitcher), which, combined with his hits, gave him a career on-base percentage of .244. Because Glavine got on base almost a quarter of the time he came at bat, opposing pitchers were never able to treat him as an automatic out in the lineup. In 2004, Glavine walked as often as he struck out (10 times each). Glavine's 201 sacrifice bunts prior to 2007 ranked second among active players at the time, only behind Omar Vizquel. Glavine won four Silver Slugger Awards, ranking him second all-time for pitchers behind Mike Hampton, while being the most among Cy Young Award Winners and Hall of Famer pitchers.

Players' union representative
Starting in 1991, Tom Glavine served as the Atlanta Braves team representative to the Major League Baseball Players Association, succeeding former NL Most Valuable Player and Braves icon Dale Murphy in the position. Prior to and during the 1994–95 Major League Baseball strike, Tom Glavine was heavily involved in negotiations between the union and team owners and was frequently interviewed and quoted in the press about the talks. Ultimately, the strike caused the cancellation of the 1994 World Series and lasted  months. When play resumed in 1995, Glavine was frequently booed by Braves fans for his role in the players' union and was criticized for it in the local Atlanta press.

Personal life

Glavine and his wife Christine married in 1998 and have a blended family of five children. One of their sons, Peyton, was selected in the 2017 MLB draft but chose to play at Auburn University. He currently pitches in the Washington Nationals organization. They live in Johns Creek, Georgia, and Glavine coaches his sons' hockey teams. Glavine is a Roman Catholic and is a member of Catholic Athletes for Christ.

Glavine is known for being humble about his accomplishments and an avid golfer, so a good friend, Jack Kennedy, gifted Glavine six dozen golf balls that display his uniform number, 47, on one side and the number of losses he had in his career on the other, 203. The gift was given around the time Glavine received the phone call that he would be a first-ballot Hall of Fame inductee.

See also

 List of Major League Baseball career wins leaders
 List of Major League Baseball annual wins leaders
 List of Major League Baseball career strikeout leaders
 Major League Baseball titles leaders

References

External links

1966 births
Living people
Atlanta Braves announcers
Atlanta Braves players
Baseball players from Massachusetts
Catholics from Massachusetts
Cy Young Award winners
Greenville Braves players
Gulf Coast Braves players
Gwinnett Braves players
Gwinnett Gladiators players
Los Angeles Kings draft picks
Major League Baseball broadcasters
Major League Baseball pitchers
Major League Baseball players with retired numbers
Mississippi Braves players
Myrtle Beach Pelicans players
National Baseball Hall of Fame inductees
National League All-Stars
National League wins champions
New York Mets players
People from Billerica, Massachusetts
People from Concord, Massachusetts
Richmond Braves players
Rome Braves players
Silver Slugger Award winners
Sportspeople from Middlesex County, Massachusetts
Sumter Braves players
World Series Most Valuable Player Award winners